HMS Liddesdale was a Type II Hunt-class destroyer of the Royal Navy built by Vickers-Armstrong in Newcastle and launched on 19 August 1940. She was laid down on 20 November 1939 and commissioned 28 February 1941. She served as a convoy escort in the Mediterranean Sea.

War service
HMS Liddesdale served as a convoy escort based from Malta for the majority of World War II. On 21 May 1944, Liddesdale, alongside the destroyers  and  sank U-453 using depth charges off the south coast of Italy.

Sources

References

 

1940 ships
Hunt-class destroyers of the Royal Navy
Naval ships of Operation Neptune
Ships built on the River Tyne
Ships built by Vickers Armstrong
World War II destroyers of the United Kingdom